Father Paul Grosjean, SJ (26 May 1900 – 13 June 1964) was a Belgian Jesuit priest, Bollandist, and Celtic scholar. 

Born in Uccle, Grosjean studied at St Michael College, Brussels before becoming a Jesuit priest in 1917. He was selected by Hippolyte Delehaye to become a Bollandist, studied at the University of Oxford, returned to Belgium for his military service, then studied in Dublin. He then returned to St Michael College, where he spent the remainder of his career, preparing a number of lives of Celtic saints. 

He was elected a Corresponding Fellow of the British Academy in 1950.

References 

 https://www.brepolsonline.net/doi/abs/10.1484/J.ABOL.4.02542
 https://www.encyclopedia.com/religion/encyclopedias-almanacs-transcripts-and-maps/grosjean-paul

1900 births
1964 deaths
Belgian Jesuits
Celtic studies scholars
Corresponding Fellows of the British Academy
Alumni of the University of Oxford
20th-century Belgian historians
Christian hagiographers